Several plans have been proposed for high-speed rail in Canada, the only G7 country that does not have any high-speed rail. In the press and popular discussion, there have been two routes frequently proposed as suitable for a high-speed rail corridor: Edmonton to Calgary via Red Deer and Windsor to Quebec City via London, Kitchener-Waterloo, Toronto, Ottawa and Montreal.

Other proposed routes include international high-speed rail link between Montreal and Boston or New York City discussed by regional leaders, though little progress has been made; if this link is ever built, it will be the first time high-speed rail crosses international borders outside Europe. On April 10, 2008, an advocacy group, High Speed Rail Canada, was formed to promote and educate Canadians on the benefits of high-speed rail in Canada.

Early high-speed rail in Canada
CN Rail created some early hopes with the UAC TurboTrain, in its Toronto–Montreal route during the 1960s. The Turbo went  in a speed run April 26, 1976 and may have attained even higher speeds in test runs in 1968–69.

CN's, and later Via Rail's, TurboTrain service was marred with lengthy interruptions to address design problems and having to cope with poor track quality (accounted for by dual passenger-freight use). The TurboTrain featured the latest technology advances such as passive coach tilting, Talgo attachment for rigid coach articulation and gas turbine power. The units were plagued by technical and reliability issues and were ultimately retired by 1982.

Beginning in the 1970s, a consortium of several companies started to study Bombardier Transportation's LRC, which was a more conventional approach to high-speed rail, in having separate cars and locomotives, rather than being an articulated train. Pulled by heavy conventional-technology diesel-electric locomotives designed for  normal operating speed and inspired by the British InterCity 125, it entered full-scale service in 1981 for Via Rail, linking cities in the Quebec City–Windsor Corridor, but at speeds never exceeding the  limit mandated by line signalling. It was the world's first active tilting train in commercial service.

Calgary–Edmonton 

2004 Van Horne Institute study 
A 2011 update to a 2004 study by the Van Horne Institute concluded that "high-speed rail would bring significant benefits to the Calgary–Edmonton corridor and Alberta as a whole". The report also stated that the project would "generate between $3.7 and $6.1 billion in quantifiable benefits". The study considered three options:
 Upgrade of an existing Canadian Pacific freight route to allow trains up to  using Bombardier's JetTrain, costing approximately $2.5 billion.
 A new dedicated passenger route, known as the "Green Field" route, also using the JetTrain, and costing approximately $3.7 billion.

On September 22, 2006, the government of Alberta announced that it was deploying video cameras along a stretch of the Queen Elizabeth Highway to measure the number of cars that travel between the two cities.

The Calgary Herald announced on April 18, 2007, that the provincial government had purchased land in downtown Calgary for a possible station or terminal. On April 7, 2011, Premier Ed Stelmach said that the land being purchased for the new location of the Royal Alberta Museum could be used as the Edmonton terminal.

Government plans 
In 2011, Alberta Premier Alison Redford said that the high-speed rail was a priority for her, saying "such an initiative could unite the province and send a message to Canada and the world about Alberta’s progress." However, during the 2012 Alberta provincial election campaign, none of the four main party leaders said that they deny the need for one, but said that it was a "maybe".

The Standing Committee on Alberta's economic future studied the feasibility of high-speed rail between Calgary and Edmonton in 2014. The committee also held hearings on the subject in early 2014 in Calgary, Red Deer and Edmonton. The report released in May 2014 stated that although Alberta was not ready for high-speed rail, the government should start planning for it by acquiring land along a transportation corridor.

In 2015, the provincial New Democratic Party (NDP) government stated it was reviving the possibility of a bullet train operating between Edmonton and Calgary. The Minister of Infrastructure, Brian Mason, said the government had issued a request for a proposal to undertake the planning and implementation of a study "to determine the future needs for the QE II highway" due to high traffic volumes. "The high-speed train between Edmonton and Calgary is something that we're beginning to ask about," said Mason. The line would cost between $2.6 and $7 billion depending on the type of technology used. Annual operating costs of a high-speed rail line were estimated to be anywhere from $88 million to $129 million. Via Rail stated that such projects 'pay for themselves.' and that the government should invest more in the Canadian rail industry. The Liberal government of Canada also endorsed and prioritized investing heavily in national and provincial infrastructure projects.

Prairie Link 
EllisDon announced on July 8, 2021, that it had formed a partnership with AECOM to plan a high-speed rail line between Calgary and Edmonton, running through Red Deer. The group formed by the partnership is named Prairie Link. EllisDon estimated the project would cost $9 billion. The project was to be entirely financed by the private sector. The memorandum of understanding (MOU) that was signed with Alberta had no financial commitment from the government. The director of Prairie Link, Jeffrey Hansen-Carlson, said that "The MOU essentially sets the stage for a cooperative relationship between Prairie Link and the government to support project development." Prairie Link also emphasized that regulatory issues would also be discussed with the government since there is little regulation for high-speed rail in Alberta.

, the project was in the planning and development phase. Construction was projected to begin in 2023 and last 7–9 years.

Quebec City–Windsor

The Quebec City–Windsor corridor is the most densely populated and heavily industrialized region of Canada. With over 18 million people, it contains approximately half of Canada's population, the national capital, and three of the four largest metropolitan areas in Canada (Toronto, Montreal and Ottawa). It is already the focus of most Via Rail service. There have been several proposals for a high-speed service, such as ViaFast, but no action has been taken . However, the former leader of the Liberal Party, Stéphane Dion, said in 2007 that he was in favour of developing a high-speed rail system as a way to fight climate change. A high-speed line along this corridor could provide international HSR services to the United States by connecting to the proposed Chicago and Ohio Hub Networks of the U.S. high-speed network. The intercity traffic in the area is currently served by several highways, Via Rail, and several airports. This corridor's population density is comparable to the Rhône River valley where the French TGV operates.

1995 study

This study was initiated in 1992. The scope included "medium-fast" (200–250 km/h) and very fast (more than 300 km/h) technologies. It produced three reports: Quebec-Ontario High Speed Rail Project, Preliminary Routing Assessment and Costing Study, Final Report and Québec-Ontario High Speed Rail Project, Final Report.

Lynx consortium

Bombardier JetTrain
In 2000, Bombardier developed the JetTrain. The high-speed train prototype generates its power to turn the wheels with a  Pratt and Whitney turbine. The Jet Train visited Calgary and Toronto in March 2003. The prototype then visited Miami on 7 October 2003 and Orlando on the 11th. After these promotional stops in the United States and Canada, no government purchased the Jet Train. The prototype is stored serviceable at the AAR/FRA Transportation Technology Center, at Pueblo, Colorado, United States.

2008 study
On January 10, 2008, Dalton McGuinty (Premier of Ontario), and Jean Charest (Premier of Quebec) announced their two provinces would conduct a joint $2 million feasibility study into the development of high-speed rail in the Quebec City–Windsor Corridor. The federal government agreed to participate in the study.
In February 2009, The EcoTrain Consortium, consisting of firms Dessau, MMM
Group, KPMG, Wilbur Smith & Associates and Deutsche Bahn International, were awarded a contract to update the feasibility studies for high-speed rail (HSR) in the Quebec City–Windsor corridor. The study was expected to take a year, but was delayed. Michael Ignatieff, then-leader of the Liberal Party said in 2011 that he would agree to fund the Quebec corridor and described it as a means to unite the country, similar to early railway projects in Canada. His NDP counterpart, Jack Layton, also pledged to fund the route.

When the results of the study were released October 17, 2011, by the citizens group High Speed Rail Canada, it revealed results for two technology alternatives: diesel traction and electric traction. Diesel traction would provide speeds of 200 km/h and would cost $18.9 billion for an entire Windsor–Quebec City system; a Montreal–Ottawa–Toronto system would cost $9.1 billion. Electric traction would provide speeds of 300 km/h and would cost $21.3 billion for an entire Windsor–Quebec City system; a Montreal–Ottawa–Toronto system would cost $11 billion. The study further revealed that a Montreal–Ottawa–Toronto system is the most economically viable section and could generate a positive net economic benefit using either diesel or electric traction.

After the report had been released, politicians and Chamber in Windsor area argued that having the less-expensive "higher speed rail" connection between Detroit, Michigan; and Windsor must be part of the consideration. Detroit is already part of higher speed rail initiative in the United States to connect to Chicago, Illinois, and to St. Louis, Missouri. They suggested that a study to include cross-border connection would account for greater economic impact.

Developments after 2014
In an interview with CBC Radio on April 15, 2014, ahead of the 2014 Ontario general election, Ontario Minister of Transportation Glen Murray announced that high-speed rail will be constructed between London, Kitchener, and Toronto within 10 years. Further details were released by Murray in a speech April 30, 2014, in London. Select results from a study prepared by a London, England–based consultancy, First Class Partnerships, was released to the public. The FCP study considered a range of options including continuing the existing service with LRC trains, incremental upgrading of the existing line with faster and more diesels, and construction of new sections of line. However the full FCP study was not publicly released.

In an interview with 'International Rail Journal' on May 2, 2014, FCP disclosed a few further details. Unlike the earlier EcoTrain study, which proposed to build a completely separate line for HSR, FCP proposed to share the existing rail corridor from Toronto to Georgetown which is being upgraded with 4 to 6 tracks and will be electrified for use by GO regional trains and Toronto's Union Pearson Express. In addition the FCP noted substantial traffic potential for a HSR line between Kitchener/Waterloo and Toronto. This contrasts with EcoTrain, which dismissed that corridor as being too short a trip to be attractive for HSR. FCP also noted the route from Kitchener to London would be across "open countryside" and reduce land acquisition issues. Murray said that next step was to prepare an environmental impact statement, and that the line might be implemented within 8 years. The project faced significant technical and political challenges. HSR trains will need to share tracks with GO regional, freight, and airport express trains. Between Bramalea and Georgetown, HSR trains will share the corridor with the Canadian National Railways main line.

In October 2014, High Speed Rail Canada announced that it would release to the public a number of feasibility studies done on the corridor. One was the FCP study of a line between London and Toronto and the other was a study was done by the SNCF and funded by cities along the Quebec–Windsor Corridor for a HSR line between Windsor and Quebec City.

High-speed rail within Ontario

On December 5, 2014, the Ontario Ministry of Transportation approved starting an environmental assessment on the best route for a high speed rail connecting Toronto, Kitchener–Waterloo, London and Windsor for 2015. On October 30, 2015 the Government of Ontario announced that David Collenette would be the special advisor for high-speed rail. Collenette delivered the Special Advisor's Final Report to the provincial government on December 2, 2016,

On May 19, 2017, Ontario Premier Kathleen Wynne and Transport Minister Steven Del Duca announced the first steps in having a high-speed rail route in place by 2025 from Toronto to London, extending to Windsor by 2031, based on the recommendations on Collenette's report. The environmental assessment for this would reportedly be coordinated with the Metrolinx project to enable two-way, all-day GO Transit trains to Kitchener and will be sharing that corridor. Premier Wynne also said that design and planning would commence "immediately" along with the assessment. The announcement was criticized as a re-election tactic in anticipation for the 2018 Ontario general election, as the Liberal Party had announced similar plans for high speed rail in 2014, also ahead of a general election that same year. However, with the election of a majority government for the Progressive Conservative Party of Ontario, the future of the high-speed rail proposal inherited from the Liberal Party became uncertain. In late 2018, it was reported that the new Ford government, while not outright cancelling the high-speed rail proposal, was expanding its scope to include alternatives such as increased Via Rail service, more bus capacity or improved highway infrastructure. The 2019 provincial budget paused all funding for the high-speed rail proposal.

High Frequency Rail 

On July 6, 2021, procurement for the Via Rail's High Frequency Rail was announced. The service is planned to operated between Toronto and Quebec City partly along newly constructed tracks that would run pass through Peterborough, Ottawa, Montreal, Laval, and Trois-Rivières, and partly along existing right of way. The government's initial announcement envisioned trains operating at a maximum speed , but the government has challenged its partners to come up with a design that can reach speeds up to  By segregating Via's passenger rail services from freight lines, travel times in some routes are expected to be reduced by up to 90 minutes, and service reliability is expected to increase from an average of 67% to 95%.

Other proposed routes

Chilliwack–Whistler 
In October 2020, a group known as the Mountain Valley Express Collective Society formed to propose the creation of a High-speed rail network for the Fraser Valley. The rail network is proposed as an alternative to supplement the growing capacity demands along the British Columbia Highway 99 corridor. The proposal would be for an end-to-end transit system running from Whistler, British Columbia to Chilliwack, with stops in major municipalities like Surrey, British Columbia, Vancouver, and Squamish, British Columbia. The BC provincial government has yet to formally approach the project.

Vancouver–Seattle 

The Pacific Northwest Corridor is one of ten high-speed rail corridors proposed by the US federal government. If the  corridor were completed as proposed,  passenger trains would travel from Eugene, Oregon, to Seattle, Washington, in 2 hours 30 minutes, and from Seattle to Surrey, British Columbia, in 2 hours 50 minutes. A dedicated line parallel to existing tracks would decrease this time into 1 hour, with  speed. The proposal is still being worked on.

The terminus on the Canadian side is proposed to be located at King George station in Surrey. This would leave passengers at the end of a public transit SkyTrain line to downtown Vancouver, a 40-minute addition to the trip. Surrey is east of Vancouver.

A second option is to run the line to Bridgeport in Richmond, BC. That is a 20-minute ride on SkyTrain to downtown Vancouver.

The State of Washington completed in December 2020 an ultra-high-speed study titled, "Cascadia High Speed Ground Transportation". The Cascadia ultra-high-speed ground transportation (UHSGT) system would connect people and communities increase economic competitiveness, and improve quality of life across the Cascadia megaregion. This fast, safe predictable way to travel would connect the metro areas of Vancouver, Seattle, and Portland.

Montreal–Boston/New York 

The first phase of the study, which included public hearings, was conducted in 2002 with the participation of the states of Massachusetts, New Hampshire, and Vermont. The second phase of the study was cancelled after New Hampshire withdrew its support.

In the 1970s, the Mayor of Montreal, Jean Drapeau, announced his project to build a TGV (high-speed line) to New York in order to replace the slow and unreliable Adirondack service operated by Amtrak. In 2001, Mayor Pierre Bourque tried to revive the TGV to New York project. The topic has also been discussed between the governor of New York and the premier of Quebec, but no progress was made after a pre-feasibility study in 2003. The line is problematic because most of the investment would need to be made through the sparsely populated Adirondack Mountains north of Albany. Between Albany and New York, relatively fast and frequent rail service is already available.

See also
 Proposed high-speed rail by country

References

Further reading

External links
 High Speed Rail Canada, an educational resource centre for high speed rail. All available past and present high speed rail studies are available for free to access on their website.
 Library of Parliament HillNote Number 2012-06E “High-Speed Rail in Canada” (Internet Archive)
 Bibliothèque du Parlement Notes de la Colline no 2012-06F Le train à grande vitesse au Canada  (Internet Archive)
 Library of Parliament Publication No. 2015-55-E Via Rail Canada Inc. and the Future of Passenger Rail in Canada, 5.1 High-speed rail
 Bibliothèque du Parlement Publication no 2015-55-F Via Rail Canada Inc. et l'avenir du transport ferroviaire de voyageurs au Canada, 5.1 Le train à grande vitesse
 High Speed Rail Canada - UAC CN Turbo Train Archives
Prairie Link

 
Railway electrification in Canada